"The Incubator" was the 36th episode of the M*A*S*H television series, and the twelfth episode of season two. The episode aired on December 1, 1973.

Plot

Henry Blake has taken delivery of a new barbecue, and with Radar's help, is assembling it in preparation for barbecuing steaks.

Meanwhile, Hawkeye and Trapper express concern that a cell culture will have to be sent to a laboratory in Tokyo, which will mean a 72-hour wait for the results.  They look into requisitioning an incubator for the 4077th.  Supply Officer Captain Sloan (Eldon Quick) tells them they cannot have one, according to the Basic Equipment List for a M*A*S*H unit, but they can have a pizza oven or other non-essential equipment.

Another supply officer, Major Morris (Ted Gehring), has hoarded three incubators but refuses to release any of them, and his superior Colonel Lambert (Logan Ramsey) is selling military equipment for personal profit. Hawkeye and Trapper eventually take their frustrations to General Mitchell (Robert F. Simon) at a press conference, leading to chaos as the journalists begin questioning both the doctors and Mitchell.

Back at the camp, Hawkeye and Trapper have to explain their actions to Blake. As they leave his office, Radar reveals his latest acquisition—an incubator, for which he has traded away Henry's barbecue.

Notes
Eldon Quick would make two further guest appearances in M*A*S*H, in the episode "Payday" (Season 3, March 1975) returning as Captain Sloan, and in the episode "The Late Captain Pierce" (Season 4, October 1975) as Captain Pratt, a character with a very similar affinity for army bureaucracy to Sloan.

Series regular Loretta Swit (Hot Lips Houlihan) does not appear in this episode.

This episode features a rare mention in prime time TV of the word "abortionist", as Henry advises Hawkeye and Trapper to not "show up looking like a couple of freelance abortionists" when they request an incubator. Abortion was not legal in most areas of the United States until earlier in the year this episode was released, following the US Supreme Court's Roe v. Wade decision of January 22, 1973. At the time of the Korean War, "freelance abortionists" would have implied people practicing medicine without a license and committing felonies.

External links

M*A*S*H (season 2) episodes
1973 American television episodes
Television episodes directed by Jackie Cooper